Barrington is both a given name and a surname of English origin.

Given name
Barrington Bartley (born 1980), American cricketer
Barrington J. Bayley (1937–2008), English science fiction writer
Barrington Belgrave (born 1980), English footballer
Barrington Boardman (born 1933), American author
Barrington Bourchier (c.1627–1695), English politician
Barrington Browne (born 1967), West Indian former cricketer
Sir Barrington Windsor Cunliffe (born 1939), British archaeologist
Barrington Dacres (died 1806), Royal Navy captain
Barrington Francis (born 1965), Jamaican/Canadian boxer
Barrington "Bo" Henderson (born 1956), African-American R&B singer
Barrington DeVaughn Hendricks (born 1989), African-American rapper, better known by his stage name JPEGMAFIA
Barrington Hole (born 1942), Welsh footballer
Barrington Irving (born 1983), Jamaican pilot who flew solo round the world
Barrington King, son of Roswell King and co-founder of Roswell, Georgia, United States
Barrington Levy (born 1964), Jamaican reggae musician
Barrington Moore Sr. (1883–unknown), American forester and forestry researcher
Barrington Moore Jr. (1913–2005), American sociologist
Barrington D. Parker Sr. (1915–1993), United States federal judge
Barrington Daniels Parker Jr. (born 1944), United States federal judge
Barrington Pheloung (1954–2019), Australian composer
Sir Barrington Reynolds (1786–1861), Royal Navy admiral
Barrington Rowland (born 1980), Indian cricketer
Barrington Watson (born 1931), Jamaican painter
Barrington Yearwood (born 1986), Barbadian cricketer

Surname
Alphonse J. Barrington (c.1832–1893), New Zealand gold prospector and explorer
Amy Barrington (c. 1858  - 1942), Irish teacher, scientist and family historian
Archibald Charles Barrington (1906–1986), New Zealand clerk, secretary and pacifist
Ben Barrington, New Zealand actor
Charles Barrington (disambiguation)
Daines Barrington, (1727–1800), English lawyer, antiquary and naturalist
Diana Barrington (born 1939), British actress
Donal Barrington (died 2018), Irish judge
 Emilie Barrington (1841–1933), British biographer and novelist
Sir Eric Barrington (1847–1918), British civil servant
Sir Francis Barrington (c.1570–1628), English lawyer and politician
George Barrington (disambiguation)
Henry Barrington (1808–1882), South African lawyer, farmer and politician
Jimmy Barrington (1901–unknown), English footballer
Joey Barrington (born 1980), English professional squash player
John Barrington (disambiguation)
Jonah Barrington (disambiguation)
Ken Barrington (1930–1981), English Test cricketer
Manliffe Barrington (1912–1999), Irish motorcycle racer
Martin Barrington, American businessman 
Mary Rose Barrington (1926-2020), British parapsychologist and barrister
Merrill Edwin Barrington (1920–1965), Canadian politician
Michael Barrington (1924–1988), British actor
Pat Barrington (born 1941), America dancer and actress
Patrick Barrington, 11th Viscount Barrington (1908–1990), Irish writer of humorous verse
Phyllis Barrington (1907–1996), American actress
Reto Barrington (born 1952), Canadian former alpine skier
Richard Barrington (disambiguation)
Rutland Barrington (1853–1922), English musical theatre performer
Sally Barrington, British oncologist and medical researcher
Samuel Barrington (1729–1800), British admiral in the Seven Years' War
Sam Barrington (born 1990), American football linebacker
Shute Barrington (1734–1826), English churchman, Bishop of Llandaff, Salisbury and Durham
Sir Thomas Barrington, 2nd Baronet (died 1644), English politician
Tom Barrington (1944–2002), former American football running back
Walter Barrington, 9th Viscount Barrington (1848–1933)
William Barrington (disambiguation)